Committee for the Defense of the Revolution may refer to:

 Committees for the Defense of the Revolution, Cuba
 Committees for the Defense of the Revolution (Burkina Faso)
 Committee for the Defence of the Revolution (Ghana), see List of abbreviations in Ghana